Origin Energy an ASX listed public company with headquarters in Sydney. It is a major integrated electricity generator, and electricity and natural gas retailer. It operates Australia’s largest coal-fired power station at Lake Macquarie, New South Wales.

History
Origin Energy was formed 18 February 2000, as a result of a spun off from Boral. SAGASCO became part of Origin Energy as part of the demerger.

Between 2001 and 2002, Origin acquired a Victorian electricity retailer licence from distributors Powercor and CitiPower. In 2004, the SEAGas pipeline was completed, linking the Victorian and South Australian gas markets. During this time, Origin obtained 50% interest in the Kupe Gas Field and Edison Mission Energy's 51.4% interest in New Zealand's Contact Energy. Origin sold its 53% shareholding in Contact Energy to the market in 2015.

On 27 November 2006, the Government of Queensland announced the sale of Sun Retail, the former retailing arm of Energex to Origin for $1.202 billion.

On 15 December 2010, Origin Energy announced that it would purchase the retail divisions of Country Energy and Integral Energy from the Government of New South Wales, at a total cost of A$3.25 billion, as well as entering a GenTrader agreement with Eraring Energy (in which Origin supplies fuel, pays certain charges, and can dispatch and sell electricity output, while Eraring Energy owns, operates and maintains the power stations). The transaction was completed on 1 March 2011.

In August 2022 the company announced a goal for net-zero direct and indirect emissions by 2050. In November 2022, Origin received a takeover offer from a Brookfield Asset Management and EIG Partners consortium for $ 18 billion|.

Core business

Natural gas exploration and production 
The company's portfolio includes the Bowen and Surat Basins in Queensland, Browse Basin in Western Australia, and the Beetaloo Basin in the Northern Territory. In 2017 Origin sold its subsidiary Lattice Energy and its conventional upstream oil and gas business to Beach Energy for $1,585 million.

Australia Pacific LNG, Queensland, Australia 
Australia Pacific LNG (APLNG) is an incorporated company owned by Origin Energy, US giant ConocoPhillips and China's Sinopec. The project consists of development of Australia Pacific LNG's gas fields in the Surat and Bowen Basins, construction of a 530 km gas transmission pipeline from the gas fields to an LNG facility on Curtis Island and construction of an LNG facility on Curtis Island.

On 26 October 2017, gas producer and exporter APLNG entered into a sales agreement with Origin Energy, to supply 41 petajoules of gas under a 14-month contract starting 1 November. The contract brings the company's total commitment to 186 PJ for 2018, representing almost 30% of Australian east coast domestic gas market demand.

Energy retailing 
Origin has approximately 4.217 million customers, servicing both large energy customers and the residential and small business market. Australia has predominantly two tiers of energy providers, A Tier 1 provider is any energy provider that holds more than 10% of the market share in any network region. Tier 2 energy providers are those that hold less than 10% of the market share within a network region. Origin Energy is a Tier 1 energy retailer.

Electricity generation 
Origin operates is able to generate 6,010 MW of electricity capacity. This represents approximately 13 per cent of power generation capacity in the National Electricity Market.

Controversies

Whistleblower allegations 
In January 2017, The Guardian reported allegations of whistleblower Sally McDow, a former compliance manager at Origin. She claimed that the company had ignored various wellfield integrity problems, including failing to maintain hundreds of wells across Australia and New Zealand, failing to seal wells after their active lives and failing to report incidents internally or to the appropriate regulators. She also described a culture of bullying and harassment within the organisation. She said that she had advised the CEO at the time, and Grant King (then President of the Business Council of Australia) but that King did not want the incidents reported. He allegedly stated that the incidents could be used by opponents of the unconventional gas industry to delay or halt current or future projects. Origin denied the allegations.

Beetaloo Basin fracking 

Origin was approved by the Northern Territory government to start fracking in August 2019 and drilling commenced in October 2019. Fracking began in September 2020 following a six-month COVID-19 induced stand down. Origin has postponed production at their Kyalla well site to the second half of 2021 due to the COVID-19 pandemic.

Concerns were expressed by local officials on the fracking operation, fearing that it could affect their ability to get groundwater and stating the local officials did not fully understand the contracts they were signing with petroleum companies. Accusations that Origin did not consult with traditional landowners before starting their planned exploration were refuted by the Northern Land Council which stated it understood the text in the contracts and consulted with traditional Aboriginal landowners. Origin stated that it conducted multiple checks when installing a well and that fracking stops if a check fails.

Misleading information and prohibited fees 
In December 2020, Origin was fined $126,000 after the Australian Competition & Consumer Commission issued an infringement for misleading information regarding price increases in a letter sent out to Victorian customers in December 2019. Origin stated in the letter that electricity prices were changing because of the Victorian Essential Services Commission's  increase to the Victorian Default Offer, an unrelated price set by the Essential Services Commission. However, the ACCC stated that the price increase was entirely Origin's choice and they chose to increase prices.

In October 2021 Origin was fined $5 million for charging 22,371 customers prohibited exit fees totaling $489,774. Origin received complaints about the fees in 2018 but continued charging them until 2020. The Essential Services Commission stated “Origin Energy knew at all times about the changes in the law banning exit fees and they even reviewed 19 different contract templates but didn’t remove the exit fees”. By October 2021 fewer than half the wrongly charged exit fees had been reimbursed.

Pollution 
In September 2022 Origin Energy pleaded guilty to releasing nearly 800,000 litres of polluted water from its coal seam gas operations in Queensland’s Western Downs region, north-west of Brisbane. According to the Department of Environment and Science, heavy rain caused water to overflow from coal seam gas tanks into a nearby waterway, including a landholder's dam.

References

External links

 Solar cells wait for their day in the sun
 GE Energy, CH2M Hill to build power plant in Australia

Companies based in Sydney
Natural gas companies of Australia
Electric power companies of Australia
Energy in Queensland
Companies listed on the Australian Securities Exchange
Oil and gas companies of New Zealand
Australian companies established in 2000
Energy companies established in 2000